Pyramidula is a genus of very small, air-breathing land snails, terrestrial pulmonate gastropod mollusks or micromollusks in the family Pyramidulidae.

Pyramidula is the type genus of the family Pyramidulidae.

Species
The type species in the genus Pyramidula is Pyramidula rupestris.

Species in the genus Pyramidula include:
 Pyramidula cephalonica (Westerlund, 1898), Balkans
 Pyramidula chorismenostoma (Westerlund & Blanc, 1879), Balkans
 Pyramidula conica Pilsbry & Hirase, 1902, Japan
 Pyramidula euomphalus (Blanford, 1861), India
 Pyramidula gracilitesta van Benthem Jutting, 1959
 Pyramidula halyi (Jousseaume, 1894), Sri Lanka
 Pyramidula humilis (Hutton, 1838), India
 Pyramidula jaenensis (Clessin, 1882), Iberian peninsula
 Pyramidula javana (Möllendorff, 1897)
 Pyramidula kobayashii Kuroda & Hukuda, 1944
 Pyramidula kuznetsovi Schileyko & Balashov, 2012, Nepal
 Pyramidula micra Pilsbry, 1927
 Pyramidula przevalskii Lindholm 1922, northwest China
 Pyramidula pusilla (Vallot, 1801), Europe and Asia
 Pyramidula rupestris (Draparnaud, 1801), Mediterranea and maybe south of Central Asia
 Pyramidula saxatilis (Hartmann, 1842)
 † Pyramidula shantungensis Yen, 1969 
Synonyms
 Pyramidula alternata (Say, 1817): synonym of Anguispira alternata (Say, 1817) (unaccepted combination)
  † Pyramidula antonini (Michaud, 1862): synonym of  † Acanthinula antonini (Michaud, 1862) 
 Pyramidula asteriscus (Morse, 1857): synonym of Planogyra asteriscus (Morse, 1857) (unaccepted combination)
 Pyramidula cockerelli Pilsbry, 1898: synonym of Discus shimekii (Pilsbry, 1890) (junior synonym)
 Pyramidula elrodi Pilsbry, 1900: synonym of Oreohelix elrodi (Pilsbry, 1900) (original combination)
 Pyramidula laosensis Saurin, 1953: synonym of Krobylos laosensis (Saurin, 1953) (original combination)
 † Pyramidula lecontei Stearns, 1902: synonym of † Discus lecontei (Stearns, 1902) (new combination)
 Pyramidula mamillata Andreae, 1904 †: synonym of Pleurodiscoides mamillatus (Andreae, 1904) † (new combination)
 Pyramidula patagonica Suter, 1900: synonym of Radiodiscus patagonicus (Suter, 1900)
 Pyramidula pauper (A. Gould, 1859): synonym of Discus pauper (A. Gould, 1859) (unaccepted combination)
 Pyramidula perspectiva (Say, 1817): synonym of Discus patulus (Deshayes, 1832) (junior homonym of Helix perspectiva Megerle von Mühlfeld, 1816; synonym)
 Pyramidula picta G. H. Clapp, 1920: synonym of Anguispira picta (G. H. Clapp, 1920)
  † Pyramidula ralstonensis Cockerell, 1914: synonym of † Discus ralstonensis (Cockerell, 1914) (new combination)
 Pyramidula randolphii Dall, 1895: synonym of Punctum randolphii (Dall, 1895) (original combination)
 † Pyramidula recurrecta (Oppenheim, 1890): synonym of  † Pfefferiola recurrecta (Oppenheim, 1890)
 Pyramidula striatella (J. G. Anthony, 1840): synonym of Discus whitneyi (Newcomb, 1864) (junior synonym)
 Pyramidula strigosa (A. Gould, 1846): synonym of Oreohelix strigosa (A. Gould, 1846) (unaccepted combination)
 † Pyramidula subteres (Clessin, 1877): synonym of † Lucilla subteres (Clessin, 1877) 
 Pyramidula umbilicata (Montague, 1803), Iberian peninsula and British Isles: synonym of Pyramidula pusilla (Vallot, 1801)  (junior subjective synonym)

References

Further reading
 Habe, T. (1956). Anatomical Studies on the Japanese Land Snails (7). Venus (Japanese Journal of Malacology). 19(2): 109-117
 Gittenberger E. & Bank R. A. 1996. A new start in Pyramidula (Gastropoda Pulmonata: Pyramidulidae). Basteria 60: 71–78.

External links
 Fitzinger, L.J. (1833). Systematisches Verzeichniß der im Erzherzogthume Oesterreich vorkommenden Weichthiere, als Prodrom einer Fauna derselben. Beiträge zur Landeskunde Oesterreichs's unter der Enns, 3: 88-122. Wien
 Pyramidula at AnimalBase
 Image of two live individuals in situ

Gastropod genera
Pyramidulidae